Bram Van Den Dries  (born 14 August 1989) is a Belgian professional volleyball player. He is a member of the Belgium national team, and a gold medallist at the 2013 European League. At the professional club level, he plays for PAOK Thessaloniki.

Honours

Clubs
 National championships
 2021/2022  Greek Championship, with Panathinaikos
 2021/2022  Greek League Cup, with Panathinaikos

Individual awards
 2007: CEV U19 European Championship – Best Scorer
 2013: European League – Most Valuable Player
 2015 CEV Challenge Cup - Best Server 
 2017: French Championship – Best Opposite
 2017: French Championship – Best Scorer 
 2019: French Championship – Best Opposite

References

External links

 
 Player profile at LegaVolley.it 
 Player profile at Volleybox.net

1989 births
Living people
People from Herselt
Sportspeople from Antwerp Province
Belgian men's volleyball players
Belgian expatriate sportspeople in Italy
Expatriate volleyball players in Italy
Belgian expatriate sportspeople in France
Expatriate volleyball players in France
Belgian expatriate sportspeople in Turkey
Expatriate volleyball players in Turkey
Belgian expatriate sportspeople in Poland
Expatriate volleyball players in Poland
Expatriate volleyball players in South Korea
Belgian expatriate sportspeople in Greece
Expatriate volleyball players in Greece
Umbria Volley players
AZS Olsztyn players
PAOK V.C. players
Panathinaikos V.C. players
Opposite hitters